Sayyid Saïd bin Sultan al-Busaidi (5 June 1791 – 19 October 1856), was Sultan of Muscat and Oman, the fifth ruler of the Busaid dynasty from 1804 to 4 June 1856. His rule commenced following the death of his father, Sultan bin Ahmad, in November 1804 and a period of conflict and internecine rivalry of succession that followed. He is often referred to as the Lion of Oman, as one of the greatest Omani sultans.

Said's uncle Qais bin Ahmad finally agreed to Said's primacy following Said's killing of his cousin, Badr bin Saif, a pretender to the throne. He is noted for having moved his capital to Zanzibar, during which time the Omani Empire reached the zenith of its power and wealth.

Early years

Said bin Sultan was son of Sultan bin Ahmed, who ruled Oman from 1792 to 1804. Sultan bin Ahmed died in 1804 on an expedition to Basra. He appointed Mohammed bin Nasir bin Mohammed al-Jabry as the Regent and guardian of his two sons, Salim bin Sultan and Said bin Sultan. Sultan's brother Qais bin Ahmad, the ruler of Sohar, decided to attempt to seize power. Early in 1805 Qais and his brother Mohammed marched south along the coast to Muttrah, which he easily captured. Qais then started to besiege Muscat. Mohammed bin Nasir tried to bribe Qais to leave, but did not succeed.

Mohammed bin Nasir called on Badr bin Saif for help.
After a series of engagements, Qais was forced to retire to Sohar. Badr bin Saif became the effective ruler.
Allied with the Wahhabis, Badr bin Saif became increasingly unpopular.
To get his wards out of the way, Badr bin Saif made Salim bin Sultan governor of al Maṣna‘ah on the Batinah coast and Said bin Sultan governor of Barka.

In 1806, Said bin Sultan lured Badr bin Saif to Barka and murdered him nearby. There are different accounts of what happened, but it seems clear that Said struck the first blow and his supporters finished the job. Said was acclaimed by the people as a liberator from the Wahhabis, who left the country. Qais bin Ahmad at once gave his support to Said. Nervous of the Wahhabi reaction, Said blamed Mohammed bin Nasir for the murder.

Sultan

Said bin Sultan became the sole ruler of Oman, apparently with the consent of his brother. Their aunt, the daughter of the Imam Ahmad bin Said al-Busaidi, seems to have influenced this decision.

In 1820, he launched a punitive expedition against the Bani Bu Ali with the assistance of the East India Company. It was defeated, but the following year a larger Company force returned and defeated the tribe.

In 1835, he ratified a treaty with the United States on very favorable terms, that had been negotiated by Edmund Roberts at Muscat on 21 September 1833, and returned by USS Peacock.

In 1837, he conquered Mombasa (now in Kenya). In 1840, Said moved his capital from Muscat to Stone Town, where Richard Waters was American Consul, and sent a ship to the United States to try to further a trading relationship.

In 1843 he nominated a nominal representative in Mogadishu and was forced to pay tribute to Sultan Yusuf Mahamud Ibrahim of the Sultanate of the Geledi.

Upon Said's death in 1856, his realm was divided. His third son, Thuwaini bin Said, became the Sultan of Muscat and Oman, and his sixth son, Majid bin Said, became the Sultan of Zanzibar.

The National Museum in Muscat houses numerous items of silverware and other possessions that belonged to Said.

Children
Said had 36 children
 Sayyid Sultan bin Said al-Said (ca. 1815–1851): an alcoholic, according to Ruete (Ch. 15), he left three sons, Saud, Faisal, and Muhammed
 Sayyid Khalid bin Said al-Said (c.1819–1854)
 Sayyid Thuwaini bin Said al-Said (also called Tueni) (−1866):  Sultan of Muscat and Oman, 1856–1866
 Sayyid Muhammad bin Said al-Said (1826–1863):  he "...was considered the most pious of our entire family.... cared little for the world and worldly goods.... possessed by... antipathy against Zanzibar" (Ch. 14, Ruete); he lived most of his life in Oman; father of Hamoud bin Mohammed, Sultan of Zanzibar. 
 Sayyid Turki bin Said (1832–1888): Sultan of Muscat and Oman, 1871–1888
 Sayyid Majid bin Said Al-Busaid (1834/5-1870): 1st Sultan of Zanzibar, 1856–1870
 Sayyid Ali bin Said al-Said (?-1893)
 Sayyid Barghash bin Said Al-Busaid (1837–1888): 2nd Sultan of Zanzibar, 1870–1888
 Sayyid Abdu'l-Wahhab bin Said al-Said (1840–1866)
 Sayyid Jamshid bin Said al-Said (1842–1870)
 Sayyid Hamdan bin Said al-Said (1843–1858)
 Sayyid Ghalib bin Said al-Said
 Sayyid Sawedan bin Said al-Said (1845–?)
 Sayyid Abdu'l-Aziz bin Said al-Said (1850–1907)
 Sayyid Khalifah bin Said Al-Busaid, 3rd Sultan of Zanzibar (1852–1890): Sultan of Zanzibar, 1888–1890
 Sayyid Hamad bin Said al-Said
 Sayyid Shuwaid bin Said al-Said
 Sayyid Abbas bin Said al-Said
 Sayyid Manin bin Said al-Said
 Sayyid Ali bin Said Al-Busaid, 4th Sultan of Zanzibar (1854–1893): Sultan of Zanzibar, 1890–1893
 Sayyid Badran bin Said al-Said (?-1887)
 Sayyid Nasir bin Said al-Said (also called Nasor) (?-1887) went to Mecca with his older sister Chadudj: died in his twenties
 Sayyid Abdu'l-Rab bin Said al-Said (?-1888)
 Sayyid Ahmad bin Said al-Said
 Sayyid Talib bin Said al-Said
 Sayyid Abdullah bin Said al-Said
 Sayyida Sharîfe of Zanzibar and Oman: the daughter of a Circassian woman, she was "a dazzling beauty with the complexion of a German blonde. Besides, she possessed a sharp intellect, which made her into a faithful advisor of my father's" (described in Ruete, Ch. 15)
 Sayyida Chole (or Khwala) of Zanzibar and Oman (died 1875): the daughter of a Mesopotamian woman, she "was particularly close to our father; her enchanting personality, her cheerfulness and charm won him over completely" (Ruete, Ch. 15)
 Sayyida Aashe of Zanzibar and Oman: full sister of Chole; after the death of their brother Hilal (1851), she "took motherly care of his eldest son Suud" (Ruete)
 Sayyida Chadudj of Zanzibar and Oman: full sister of Majid; after his death (1870), she went with her younger brother Nasir to Mecca and died not long afterward (Ruete)
 Sayyida Shewâne of Zanzibar and Oman: the daughter of an Abyssinian woman; "a classical beauty ... endowed with a keen mind", she died early (Ruete)
 Sayyida Mettle of Zanzibar and Oman: the daughter of an Abyssinian woman, she married a "distant cousin" in Stonetown and had "two charming twin boys" (Ruete)
 Sayyida Zeyâne of Zanzibar and Oman: the daughter of an Abyssinian woman (Ruete)
 Sayyida Semsem of Zanzibar and Oman: full sister of Zeyâne, she was married "rather late in life [to] our distant cousin Humud" (Ruete)
 Sayyida Nunu of Zanzibar and Oman: the daughter of a Circassian woman, she was born blind; after the deaths of her parents, she lived with her sister Aashe (Ruete)
 Sayyida Salme of Zanzibar and Oman (1844–1924): she became known as Emily Ruetefrom then

References
Citations

Sources

Further reading
Memoirs of an Arabian Princess from Zanzibar, Emily Ruete, 1888. (Many reprints). Author (1844–1924) was born Princess Salme of Zanzibar and Oman and was a daughter of Sayyid Said. In the fifteenth chapter of her book, she describes her sisters and two of her brothers (Hilal and Thuweini).

External links
 Seyyid Said Facts

1790 births
1856 deaths
18th-century Arabs
18th-century Omani people
19th-century Arabs
19th-century Omani people
Al Said dynasty
Modern child monarchs
People from Ad Dakhiliyah Governorate
Sons of Omani sultans 
Sultans of Oman
Sultans of Zanzibar